Akuwal village comes under the Nurmahal development block of Jalandhar. Jalandhar is a district in the Indian state of Punjab.

About 
Akuwal lies on the Phillaur-Nakodar road. The nearest railway station to Akuwal is Bilga Railway station at 12 km from it.

Post code 

Akuwal's post office is Talwaj.

References 

Villages in Jalandhar district